Tart is a commune in the Côte-d'Or department in eastern France. It was established on 1 January 2019 by merger of the former communes of Tart-le-Haut (the seat) and Tart-l'Abbaye.

See also
Communes of the Côte-d'Or department

References

Communes of Côte-d'Or
Populated places established in 2019
2019 establishments in France